Chitipa is the capital of Chitipa District, Malawi and the birthplace of Malawian lawyer, politician, and philanthropist James Nyondo.  It is also known as Fort Hill.  It is very near Malawi's tri-point border with Zambia and Tanzania.

Climate

Demographics

References

Malawi–Zambia border crossings
Populated places in Northern Region, Malawi